The Bearwallow Mountain Lookout Cabins and Shed are located in the Bearwallow Park near Mogollon, New Mexico. Built in 1940 by the Works Progress Administration, they are one of three New Deal-era buildings in the Gila National Forest, which also include the El Caso Lookout Complex and the Mangas Mountain Lookout Complex. In 2006 the buildings were threatened by the Bear Fire, which burned across Bearwallow Mountain.

See also

National Register of Historic Places in Catron County, New Mexico

References

Buildings and structures in Catron County, New Mexico
Works Progress Administration in New Mexico
Government buildings completed in 1940
Gila National Forest
1940 establishments in New Mexico
Fire lookout towers on the National Register of Historic Places in New Mexico
National Register of Historic Places in Catron County, New Mexico